Sarmiento Department is a  department of Chubut Province in Argentina.

The provincial subdivision has a population of about 8,724 inhabitants in an area of 14,563 km², and its capital city is Sarmiento, which is located around 1,909 km from the Capital federal.

Settlements
Buen Pasto
Sarmiento
Matasiete
Las Pulgas
Los Manantiales
Puerto El Chulengo

External links
Patagonia website 

Departments of Chubut Province